Surma is a former village development committee in Bajhang District in Sudurpashchim Province of western Nepal.. At the time of the 1991 Nepal census it had a population of 2,002 and had 367 houses in the village.

References

Populated places in Bajhang District